The sacral lymph nodes are placed in the concavity of the sacrum, in relation to the middle and lateral sacral arteries; they receive lymphatics from the rectum and posterior wall of the pelvis.

References

External links
 http://anatomy.uams.edu/AnatomyHTML/lymph_pelvis&perineum.html

Lymphatics of the torso